The 1988 Chico State Wildcats football team represented California State University, Chico as a member of the Northern California Athletic Conference (NCAC) during the 1988 NCAA Division II football season. Led by Mike Bellotti in his fifth and final season as head coach, Chico State compiled an overall record of 3–7 with a mark of 3–2 in conference play, tying for second place in the NCAC. The team was outscored by its opponents 231 to 205 for the season. The Wildcats played home games at University Stadium in Chico, California.

Bellotti finished his tenure as Chico State with an overall record of 21–25–2, for a .458 winning percentage. He left Chico State to become the offensive coordinator at the University of Oregon, and later served as head football coach, from 1995 to 2008.

Schedule

References

Chico State
Chico State Wildcats football seasons
Chico State Wildcats football